The Witch and the Saint by Steven Reineke is a one movement symphonic band piece describing the lives of Helena and Sibylla, twin sisters born in Germany at the end of the 16th century. The piece has five distinct parts and has become a favorite among audiences and bands though the story behind it has been virtually forgotten.

The Music 
The Witch and the Saint has a running time of 10:22. It is a tone poem, composed in 2004. Overall, it’s an epic pieceanyone listening to it without knowing the story behind it would get the impression of a melancholy story being told through powerful musical phrases.

The piece opens with a thundering timpani pickup. A Gregorian chant type motif follows quietly and builds throughout the brass instrument section. The dark, threatening feel is broken suddenly by a melody portrayed by an oboe or flute solo as the bells join on after the new mood is established. That certain melody is recurrent and returns three more times in the entire piece. This first time, the melody is very airy. The eight-bar solo ends with the return of the ominous feel before the entire band is made to crescendo enormously.

From here, the piece speeds up dramatically. The primary melody is established by the first flutes, and the texture builds from here, growing progressively uneasy. The climax of the section is very Medieval sounding, and reaches an entirely new altitude not seen again in this piece. This section is noted for being difficult for the flutes and piccolo, as they are expected to play legato and slurred right at the top of their registers and intonation flaws are easily noticeable throughout due to the registers and chords in most parts.

The tempo and velocity of the piece dies down, and the slow melody repeats itself here, this time in a lower key and by the first flutes. To accompany this, a French horn melody is introduced, followed again by the previous melody in a different key.

The reminiscent fast section begins againthis time in a different key, with an altered melody. This section is far less angry, but houses a different sort of velocity, the emphasis on the low sections of the band as opposed to the higher sections the first time.

The final section of the piece comes in with the final occurrence of the slow melody. Note that the previous times evoked sadness, hopelessness and loneliness. This time, it is heroic, and very full of hope. The band is playing with a thicker assortment of textures and counter-melodies. The piece, which by now seems to end on a happy note, drops the heroism and a few thundering angry notes roar, then suddenly fade into a melancholy echo of the very beginning.

Reception 
Plainly, this piece has gained much popularity by conductors, performers, and audiences. Performers find the piece very satisfying as each instrument is given independence. Instruments such as the tenor saxophone, bass clarinet, Euphonium and the French horn have numerous solos, so much of the attention is dispersed evenly. Also, many different sections have their own part in the melody including the saxophone, the clarinet, and the percussion section (especially the chimes and bells). Conductors favor this piece due to challenging chords, strange time signatures, but most importantly, the independence of instruments normally overshadowed.

The story 
Helena and Sibylla were twins born in Germany in 1588. In that era twins were a bad omen and said to draw evil towards them. The girls also had the gift of foresight and were able to see that which had not yet come to pass. The suspicions of the general public were supported once the girls were old enough and began using their ability.

Sibylla was raised at home and it took very little time for the village to notice her unexplainable knowledge of the future. When they did, She was labeled witch and sorceress by the townsfolk and was hated and feared. She led a quiet, empty childhood being bullied and shunned by society.

Helena led a very different life. She was sent away to a convent to be raised in the church as a nun. Once her ability was discovered the community revered her and she was seen as a saint and sage by everyone and given the highest respect by even the wisest of men.

The two girls grew up facing their own challenges and struggles trying to fit into the societies in to which they had been placed. Helena continued her life as a saint and prophet and Sibylla learned to be a midwife and helped the people as best she could. She was eventually accused of being a witch and sent to jail for life. Helena learned of her sister’s trouble and raced back to the town they had been born in to rescue her.

Helena freed her sister from the jail and they ran off towards the forest. Before they got very far, however, they were captured. In her fear of the wrath of the villagers, and of the torment, Helena drank a poison and died in her sister’s arms. Sibylla’s heart was shattered, and while still grieving the loss of the only one in the world she had ever loved, she buried her sister’s body. She then rode off to find a place where she would not be known as a witch. She was never seen again.

Alternative: It is also said that Helena was burned at the stake for aiding a witch.

Alternative: Helena felt bad for her sister and traded places with her. So Sibylla became a saint and Helena a witch.

Instrumentation 
 Woodwinds
 Piccolo, Flutes 1 & 2, Oboe, Bassoon, B Clarinets 1, 2 & 3, B Bass Clarinet, E Alto Saxophones 1 & 2, B Tenor Saxophone, E Baritone Saxophone
 Brass
 B Trumpets 1, 2 & 3, F Horns 1 & 2, Trombones 1, 2 & 3, Euphonium, Tuba
 Strings
 String Bass (optional)
 Percussion
 Percussion 1: Snare Drum, Bass Drum
 Percussion 2: Cymbals (Suspended Cymbal and Crash Cymbal), Triangle
 Auxiliary Percussion: Deep Floor Tom, Large Tam-Tam, Cabasa
 Mallet Percussion: Chimes, Bells, Tambourine, Timpani

First performance 
The piece was an ordered composition for the Youth Wind Orchestra of Ellwangen (Germany) and it was a present for their 50th anniversary. In 2004, they performed it on their anniversary concert.

References 
 
 The Witch and the Saint

External links 
 conductor score sample
 An audio sample

Symphonic poems
Concert band pieces
2004 compositions